Bréhal is a commune in the Manche department in Normandy in northwestern France.

Population

International relations
Bréhal is twinned with Lydney in Gloucestershire.

Heraldry

See also
Communes of the Manche department

References

Communes of Manche